Alípio de Miranda-Ribeiro (21 February  1874, Rio Preto, Minas Gerais – 8 January 1939) was a Brazilian herpetologist and ichthyologist.  His son, Paulo de Miranda-Ribeiro (1901-1965) was also a zoologist.

From an early age Alípio de Miranda-Ribeiro had a passion for natural history; as an adolescent he translated works of Buffon into Portuguese. He studied medicine in Rio de Janeiro, and from 1894 worked as a preparator at the National Museum of Brazil. Here he later served as secretary (from 1899), and director of the department of zoology (from 1929).

During his career he explored the Amazon region many times, and under the direction of Candido Rondon (1865-1958), he took part in installing the first telegraph through the Amazon and Mato Grosso. In 1911, after visiting museums and fishery programs in Europe and the United States, he founded a fisheries inspectorate in Brazil, the first official services on fisheries in the nation.

In 1911 he published the highly regarded Fauna brasiliensis-Peixes (Brazilian fishes). He was also the author of numerous works in the field of herpetology.

Taxon named in his honor 
The genus of trematode parasites of amphibians Ribeiroia is named after him.
The South American catfish Glanidium ribeiroi Haseman, 1911 is named after him.

Taxon described by him
See :Category:Taxa named by Alípio de Miranda-Ribeiro

References 
 This article is based on a translation of an equivalent article at the French Wikipedia, namely: Kraig Adler (1989). Contributions to the History of Herpetology, Society for the study of amphibians and reptiles : 202 p.

1874 births
1939 deaths
Brazilian herpetologists
Brazilian ichthyologists
People from Minas Gerais
20th-century Brazilian scientists
19th-century Brazilian scientists